Ruslan Andreyevich Mikhaylov (born 22 February 1979) is a former Russian professional footballer.

External links
 

1979 births
People from Novorossiysk
Living people
Russian footballers
Association football midfielders
FC Lokomotiv Nizhny Novgorod players
FC Metallurg Lipetsk players
FC Dynamo Stavropol players
FC Vostok players
FC Zhetysu players
Kazakhstan Premier League players
Russian expatriate footballers
Expatriate footballers in Kazakhstan
Russian expatriate sportspeople in Kazakhstan
Sportspeople from Krasnodar Krai